Serixia is a genus of longhorn beetles of the subfamily Lamiinae, containing the following species:

subgenus Nigroserixia
 Serixia atripes Breuning, 1958

subgenus Serixia

 Serixia affinis Aurivillius, 1927
 Serixia albertisi Breuning, 1950
 Serixia albofemorata Aurivillius, 1927
 Serixia albopleura Gressitt, 1935
 Serixia albosternalis Breuning, 1958
 Serixia andamanensis Breuning, 1958
 Serixia andamanica Gardner, 1963
 Serixia annulata Breuning, 1958
 Serixia anterufa Breuning, 1961
 Serixia apicalis Pascoe, 1856
 Serixia apicenigra Breuning, 1958
 Serixia argentea Aurivillius, 1922
 Serixia argenteifrons Breuning, 1958
 Serixia argenteipennis Breuning, 1950
 Serixia assamana Breuning, 1967
 Serixia assamensis Breuning, 1958
 Serixia atra Pic, 1936
 Serixia atritarsis Pic, 1929
 Serixia atroapicalis Breuning, 1953
 Serixia auratoides Breuning, 1958
 Serixia aureosplendens Breuning, 1958
 Serixia aureovittata Breuning, 1958
 Serixia aurescens Breuning, 1965
 Serixia aurulenta Pascoe, 1867
 Serixia bakeri Breuning, 1959
 Serixia basalis Pascoe, 1866
 Serixia basilana Breuning, 1959
 Serixia basirufa Breuning, 1950
 Serixia batchianensis Breuning, 1958
 Serixia bihamata Aurivillius, 1927
 Serixia binhensis Breuning, 1958
 Serixia bootangana Breuning, 1958
 Serixia botelensis Kano, 1933 
 Serixia buruensis Breuning, 1958
 Serixia cavifrons Aurivillius, 1927
 Serixia cebuensis Breuning, 1958
 Serixia celebensis Breuning, 1958
 Serixia celebiana Breuning, 1958
 Serixia cephalotes Pascoe, 1862
 Serixia ceylonica Breuning, 1958
 Serixia cheesmani Breuning, 1961
 Serixia chinensis Breuning, 1948
 Serixia cinereotomentosa  Breuning, 1958
 Serixia coomani Pic, 1929
 Serixia corporaali Breuning, 1950 
 Serixia cupida Pascoe, 1867
 Serixia curta Breuning, 1950
 Serixia dapitana Breuning, 1960
 Serixia densevestita Breuning, 1950
 Serixia discoidalis Pic, 1936
 Serixia elegans Aurivillius, 1927
 Serixia elongatula Breuning, 1950
 Serixia flavicans Breuning, 1950
 Serixia formosana Breuning, 1960
 Serixia fulvida Pascoe, 1867
 Serixia fuscotibialis Breuning, 1958
 Serixia fuscovittata Breuning, 1963
 Serixia griseipennis Gressitt, 1938
 Serixia histrio (Pascoe, 1859)
 Serixia impuncticollis Breuning, 1963
 Serixia inapicalis Pic, 1928
 Serixia inconspicua Gardiner, 1936
 Serixia javanica Breuning, 1950
 Serixia khasiana Breuning, 1958
 Serixia kisana (Matsushita, 1937)
 Serixia laosensis Breuning, 1958
 Serixia laticeps Pic, 1928
 Serixia latitarsis Breuning, 1958
 Serixia literata (Pascoe, 1858)
 Serixia longicornis (Pascoe, 1858)
 Serixia malaccana Breuning, 1958
 Serixia marginata Pascoe, 1867
 Serixia matangensis Breuning, 1958
 Serixia maxima Breuning, 1963
 Serixia menadensis Breuning, 1960
 Serixia merangensis Breuning, 1958
 Serixia microphthalma Breuning, 1958
 Serixia mindanaonis Aurivillius, 1927
 Serixia mindoroensis Breuning, 1960
 Serixia modesta Pascoe, 1856
 Serixia modiglianii Breuning, 1958
 Serixia mortyana Breuning, 1958
 Serixia multipunctata Breuning, 1958
 Serixia nicobarica Breuning, 1958
 Serixia nigricornis Breuning, 1958
 Serixia nigripennis Breuning, 1955
 Serixia nigritarsis Breuning, 1950
 Serixia nigroapicalis Aurivillius, 1927
 Serixia nigrofasciata Pic, 1926
 Serixia nigrolateralis Breuning, 1958
 Serixia nigrotibialis Breuning, 1950
 Serixia nilghirica Breuning, 1963
 Serixia niveotomentosa Aurivillius, 1927
 Serixia novaebritanniae Breuning, 1958
 Serixia optabilis Pascoe, 1867
 Serixia ornata Pascoe, 1862
 Serixia palliata Pascoe, 1867
 Serixia phaeoptera Aurivillius, 1927
 Serixia plagiata Aurivillius, 1927
 Serixia praeusta Pascoe, 1867
 Serixia prasinata Pascoe, 1866
 Serixia prolata (Pascoe, 1858)
 Serixia proxima (Pascoe, 1859)
 Serixia pseudoplagiata Breuning, 1950
 Serixia pubescens Gressitt, 1940
 Serixia puncticollis Breuning, 1960
 Serixia punctipennis Breuning, 1950
 Serixia quadrina Pascoe, 1867
 Serixia quadriplagiata Aurivillius, 1927
 Serixia ranauensis Hayashi, 1975
 Serixia robusta Breuning, 1950
 Serixia rondoni Breuning, 1962
 Serixia rufobasipennis Breuning, 1964
 Serixia rufula Breuning, 1950
 Serixia salomonum Breuning, 1958
 Serixia sandakana Breuning, 1958
 Serixia sarawakensis Breuning, 1958
 Serixia sedata Pascoe, 1862
 Serixia sericeipennis Breuning, 1963
 Serixia signaticornis Schwarzer, 1925
 Serixia simplex (Aurivillius, 1927)
 Serixia singaporana Breuning, 1958
 Serixia sinica Gressitt, 1937
 Serixia spinipennis Breuning, 1961
 Serixia subaurea Aurivillius, 1922
 Serixia subelongata Pic, 1936
 Serixia sumatrana Breuning, 1958
 Serixia testaceicollis Kano, 1933
 Serixia thailandensis Villiers & Chujo, 1962
 Serixia trigonocephala (Heller, 1915)
 Serixia triplagiata Breuning, 1955
 Serixia truncata Breuning, 1958 
 Serixia truncatipennis Breuning, 1950
 Serixia uniformis (Heller, 1915)
 Serixia varians Pascoe, 1866
 Serixia variantennalis Breuning, 1960
 Serixia variicornis Breuning, 1958
 Serixia varioscapus (Heller, 1915)
 Serixia vateriae Gardner, 1936
 Serixia vitticollis Breuning, 1958
 Serixia woodlarkiana Breuning, 1958

subgenus Xyaste
 Serixia finita (Pascoe, 1867)
 Serixia fumosa (Pascoe, 1867)
 Serixia invida (Pascoe, 1867)
 Serixia nigripes (Pascoe, 1858)
 Serixia paradoxa (Pascoe, 1867)
 Serixia paradoxoides Breuning, 1958
 Serixia rubripennis Pic, 1931
 Serixia semiusta (Pascoe, 1867)
 Serixia torrida (Pascoe, 1867)

References

 
Saperdini
Cerambycidae genera
Taxa named by Francis Polkinghorne Pascoe